The statue of Alexander von Humboldt by German sculptor Gustav Bläser is installed on Budapester Straße in Berlin-Tiergarten, Berlin, Germany.

External links

 

19th-century establishments in Germany
19th-century sculptures
Alexander von Humboldt
Outdoor sculptures in Berlin
Sculptures of men in Germany
Statues in Berlin
Works by German people